Sylvan is a former settlement in Panther Creek Township, Cass County, Illinois, United States. Sylvan was southwest of Newmansville.

The town was populated during the mid-19th century by mostly Irish immigrants. Currently, there is one cemetery there. Sylvan is located near Jim Edgar Park.

A photo of this ghost town was briefly shown in the movie Silent Hill. In the film, the town was misspelled as "Sylvane".

References

Antique Map of Sylvan

Geography of Cass County, Illinois
Ghost towns in Illinois